The 2013 United States Grand Prix is a Formula One motor race that was held at the Circuit of the Americas on 17 November 2013. The race was the eighteenth and penultimate round of the 2013 season, and marks the second running of the United States Grand Prix in Austin. The race was won by Red Bull-Renault's Sebastian Vettel, for his eighth consecutive win, a new F1 record for consecutive wins within a single season.

This would be Red Bull's last win at the Circuit of the Americas until the 2021 United States Grand Prix.

Report

Background

Driver changes
Kimi Räikkönen announced a week before the Grand Prix that he would be missing the final two races of 2013, in order to have back surgery. He had wanted to delay the operation until the off-season, but suffered increasing discomfort over the previous races. Räikkönen's decision meant that the previous race was his last race competing for Lotus, having agreed to join Ferrari for the  season. His place was taken by Heikki Kovalainen, who signed a two-race deal with the team.

Tyres
Like the previous United States Grand Prix, tyre supplier Pirelli will bring its orange-banded hard compound tyre as the harder "prime" tyre and the white-banded medium compound tyre as the softer "option" tyre.

Free practice
Jenson Button was given a three-place grid penalty for the race, after overtaking under red flags during the opening practice session. Charles Pic was given a five-place penalty for the race after Caterham changed the gearbox in his car.

Qualifying
Esteban Gutiérrez and Max Chilton were given penalties for impeding other drivers in the first qualifying session. Gutiérrez, who blocked Pastor Maldonado was handed a ten-place grid penalty; Chilton had serve a drive-through penalty within the first five laps of the race after he impeded both Maldonado and Adrian Sutil.

Race 
At the start, Sebastian Vettel led away but soon after the safety car was deployed after Pastor Maldonado and Adrian Sutil collided, sending the latter into the barriers. At the restart on lap 5, Vettel quickly built up his lead and was never challenged en route to his 8th consecutive victory, taking the fastest lap with two laps remaining. Behind him Lotus driver Romain Grosjean held off Vettel's teammate, Mark Webber, for 2nd.

Post-race
Jean-Éric Vergne was given a 20-second penalty for a collision with Esteban Gutiérrez on the final lap of the race. He moved down from 12th to 16th as a result.

Classification

Qualifying

Notes:
 – Esteban Gutiérrez qualified 10th, but was given a ten-place grid penalty for the race after blocking Pastor Maldonado during qualifying.
 – Jenson Button qualified 13th, but was given a three-place grid penalty for the race, after overtaking under red flags during the opening practice session.
 – Charles Pic qualified 21st, but was given a five-place penalty for the race after a gearbox change.

Race

Notes:
 – Jean-Éric Vergne was penalised 20 seconds post-race for colliding with Esteban Gutiérrez.

Championship standings after the race

Drivers' Championship standings

Constructors' Championship standings

References

External links
2013 United States Grand Prix at formula1.com

United States
Grand Prix
United States Grand Prix
United States Grand Prix
United States Grand Prix
Sports in Austin, Texas
United States Grand Prix